Ramveer Upadhyay (1 August 1957 – 2 September 2022) was an Indian politician and a member of the 17th Legislative Assembly of the state of Uttar Pradesh, India. He represented the Sadabad constituency of Uttar Pradesh as a member of the Bahujan Samaj Party (BSP) political party. Previously he represented the Sikandra Rao and Hathras constituencies, being member of the assembly four times in the process. On 14 January 2022, he resigned from the Bahujan Samaj Party and on 15 January 2022, he joined the Bharatiya Janata Party (BJP).

Personal life
Upadhyay was born in the village of Bamauli in Hathras district to Ram Charan Upadhyay. He attained Bachelor of Laws degree from Meerut University. Upadhyay married Seema Upadhyay
on 14 February 1985, with whom he had two daughters and a son. He was a lawyer and agriculturalist by profession. Upadhyay died from cancer on 2 September 2022, at the age of 65.

Political career
Upadhyay was a MLA for five terms. He represented the Sikandra Rao constituency as a member of the Bahujan Samaj Party political party. From 2017, he represented the Sadabad constituency.

Positions held

See also
 Sikandra Rao
 Sixteenth Legislative Assembly of Uttar Pradesh
 Uttar Pradesh Legislative Assembly

References 

1957 births
2022 deaths 
Deaths from cancer in India
Bahujan Samaj Party politicians from Uttar Pradesh
Uttar Pradesh MLAs 1997–2002
Uttar Pradesh MLAs 2002–2007
Uttar Pradesh MLAs 2007–2012
Uttar Pradesh MLAs 2012–2017
Uttar Pradesh MLAs 2017–2022
Chaudhary Charan Singh University alumni
People from Hathras district
Bharatiya Janata Party politicians from Uttar Pradesh